Richardson County is the easternmost county in the U.S. state of Nebraska. As of the 2010 census, the population was 8,363. Its county seat is Falls City.

In the Nebraska license plate system, Richardson County is represented by the prefix 19 (it had the nineteenth-largest number of vehicles registered in the county when the license plate system was established in 1922).

Parts of the Ioway Reservation and the Sac and Fox Reservation are located in the southeast corner of the county between Falls City, Rulo (Nebraska), and Hiawatha (Kansas).  The incorporated village of Preston, Nebraska is located inside the latter reservation.

History
The Nebraska Territory, including this county, was opened for settlement through the Kansas–Nebraska Act on May 30, 1854. Richardson County was created that same year and reorganized in 1855 by the first territorial legislature.  It was named after William A. Richardson, a US Representative from the state of Illinois who had sponsored the Kansas-Nebraska Act; subsequently, in 1858, Richardson was appointed governor of the Nebraska Territory.

The first courthouse was built in 1863. The second courthouse was built in 1873 and burned on May 7, 1919.

On May 30, 1879, the "Irving, Kansas Tornado" passed through Richardson County. Eighteen people were killed and sixty were injured in this tornado.

In the summer of 1966, Braniff Airlines Flight 250 crashed near Falls City due to bad weather, killing all 42 on board. The BAC One-Eleven aircraft was on the Kansas City to Omaha leg of a multi-stop flight from New Orleans to Minneapolis on Saturday night, August 6.

Geography
Richardson County lies at the SE tip of Nebraska. Its east boundary line abuts the west boundary line of the state of Missouri (across the Missouri River). Its south boundary line abuts the north boundary line of the state of Kansas. Several branches and tributaries of the Big Nemaha River flow southeast through the county, depositing their waters into the Missouri River at the county's SE corner. The county's terrain consists of rolling hills, sloped to the southeast, cut by numerous drainages. The county area is largely devoted to agriculture. The lowest point in the state of Nebraska is located on the Missouri River in Richardson County, where it flows out of Nebraska and into Kansas and Missouri.

Major highways
The major highways through the area are U.S. Highway 73 and U.S. Highway 75 running north and south through the county, U.S. Highway 159 running east toward the Rulo bridge (and connecting to the state of Missouri), and Nebraska Highway 8 running west along the southern border of Nebraska. Other state highways provide connections between smaller towns.

  U.S. Highway 73
  U.S. Highway 75
  U.S. Highway 159
  Nebraska Highway 8
  Nebraska Highway 62
  Nebraska Highway 67
  Nebraska Highway 105

Protected area

 Four Mile Creek State Wildlife Management Area
 Indian Cave State Park (part)
 Kirkmans Cove Recreation Area
 Verdon Lake State Recreation Area

Adjacent counties

 Nemaha County - north
 Holt County, Missouri - east
 Doniphan County, Kansas - southeast
 Brown County, Kansas - south
 Nemaha County, Kansas - southwest
 Pawnee County - west

Demographics

As of the 2000 United States Census, there were 9,531 people, 3,993 households, and 2,567 families in the county. The population density was 17 people per square mile (7/km2). There were 4,560 housing units at an average density of 8 per square mile (3/km2). The racial makeup of the county was 95.65% White, 0.19% Black or African American, 2.32% Native American, 0.15% Asian, 0.22% from other races, and 1.48% from two or more races. 1.05% of the population were Hispanic or Latino of any race.

There were 3,993 households, out of which 29.50% had children under the age of 18 living with them, 53.40% were married couples living together, 7.40% had a female householder with no husband present, and 35.70% were non-families. 32.20% of all households were made up of individuals, and 17.70% had someone living alone who was 65 years of age or older. The average household size was 2.34 and the average family size was 2.95.

The county population contained 25.50% under the age of 18, 5.90% from 18 to 24, 23.80% from 25 to 44, 23.30% from 45 to 64, and 21.50% who were 65 years of age or older. The median age was 41 years. For every 100 females there were 93.50 males. For every 100 females age 18 and over, there were 90.00 males.

The median income for a household in the county was $29,884, and the median income for a family was $39,779. Males had a median income of $25,938 versus $18,775 for females. The per capita income for the county was $16,460. About 6.30% of families and 10.10% of the population were below the poverty line, including 10.50% of those under age 18 and 11.50% of those age 65 or over.

Communities

Cities
 Falls City (county seat)
 Humboldt

Villages

 Barada
 Dawson
 Preston
 Rulo
 Salem
 Shubert
 Stella
 Verdon

Unincorporated communities
 Nim City
 Strausville

Former communities

 Archer
 Arago
 Mount Roy
 Winnebago
 Yankton

Politics
Richardson County voters have been reliably Republican for decades. In only one national election since 1936 has the county selected the Democratic Party candidate (as of 2020).

See also
 National Register of Historic Places listings in Richardson County, Nebraska

References

External links

 
 Falls City Journal

 
Nebraska counties on the Missouri River
1855 establishments in Nebraska Territory
Populated places established in 1855